Adalaj Stepwell or Rudabai Stepwell is a stepwell located in the small town of Adalaj, close to Gandhinagar city in the Indian state of Gujarat. It was built in 1498 in the memory of Rana Veer Singh (the Vaghela dynasty of Dandai Des) by his wife, Queen Rudadevi.

Introduction to stepwells

While in Gujarati and Marwari language, the stepwell is called a vav (leading down to the level of water), in other Hindi-speaking regions of North India, it is known as a baoli (also spelt, 'bawdi', 'bawri' and  'bavadi').

Step wells like the one in Adalaj were once integral to the semi-arid regions of Gujarat, as they provided water for drinking, washing, and bathing. These wells were also venues for colorful festivals and sacred rituals.

Stepwells, also called stepped ponds, built between the 5th and 19th centuries, are common in Western India; over 120 such wells are reported in the semi-arid region of Gujarat alone, of which the well at Adalaj is one of the most popular. Stepwells are also found in more arid regions of the Indian subcontinent, extending into Pakistan to collect rainwater during seasonal monsoons. While many such structures are utilitarian in construction, they sometimes include significant architectural embellishments, as in the Adalaj stepwell, which attracts many tourists. In the past, these stepwells were frequented by travelers and caravans as stopovers along trade routes.

India's first rock-cut stepwells are dated from 200-400 AD. Subsequently, the wells at Dhank (550-625) and construction of stepped ponds at Bhinmal (850-950) took place.

The city of Mohenjo-daro has wells, which may be the predecessor of the step well; as many as 700 wells have been discovered in just one section of the city, leading scholars to believe that cylindrical brick lined wells were invented by the people of the Indus Valley civilization. Between third and second millennium BC, at the "Great Bath", at the site of Mohenjodaro of the Harappan civilization, filling of water was achieved from a large well located in one of the rooms in front of the open courtyard of the building–complex.

While early stepwells were made of stone, later step wells were made of mortar, stucco, rubble, and laminar stones. The well cylinder was the basic form used to deepen the wells. It is also inferred that the Stepwells in Gujarat have survived so long because of the builder's knowledge of the soil conditions and the earthquake proneness of the region.

The well size recommended, based on considerations of stability, was of four to thirteen hasta ('hasta' a Sanskrit word, which means  "forearm" of size varying from ), A size of eight hasta was considered ideal, and a 13 hasta well was considered dangerous. However, the well thickness from top to bottom remained generally uniform. By the 11th century, the stepwell planning and design acquired architectural excellence and the Hindu Stepwells were standardized.

History
The Adalaj stepwell or 'Vav', as it is called in Gujarati, is intricately carved and is five stories deep. It was built in 1498. An inscription in Sanskrit establishes the history of the Adalaj stepwell found on a marble slab positioned in a recess on the first floor, from the eastern entry to the well. Its construction was started by Rana Veer Singh of the Vaghela dynasty of Dandai Desh. But he was killed in a war, whereafter the Muslim king Mahmud Begada of a neighboring state built it in Indo-Islamic architectural style, in 1499.

The Sanskrit inscription in the stepwell describes,

Then follows a glowing description of the well, after which the queen, or rather lady of the chief, is praised in a few verses; the expense is stated at 5,00,111 tankas or over five lakhs, and the whole ends with a repetition of the date as given above.

The cultural and architectural depiction in the deep wells at various levels are a tribute to the history of step wells, built initially by Hindus and subsequently ornamented and blended with Islamic architecture during the Muslim rule.

Legend
As per legend the 15th century, Rana Veer Singh of the Vaghela dynasty, a Hindu ruler, reigned over this territory known as Dandai Desh. His kingdom was a small one. It was subject to water shortage and was highly dependent on the rains. To alleviate the misery of his people, the Rana began the construction of a large and deep stepwell.

Before this project could be completed, his kingdom was attacked by Mohammed Begda, the Muslim ruler of a neighbouring kingdom. The Rana king was killed in battle, and Mohammed Begda occupied his territory. Rana Veer Singh's widow, a beautiful lady, known as Rani Roopba (or Roodabai), wanted to perform Sati and join her husband in the afterlife. However, Begada prevented her from giving up her own life and proposed marriage with the dowager.

She agreed to a marriage proposal on the condition that he would first complete the building of the stepwell. The Muslim king, who was deeply enamored of the queen's beauty, agreed to the proposal and built the well in record time. Once the well was completed, Begda reminded the queen of her promise to marry him. Instead, the queen who had achieved her objective of completing the stepwell started by her husband decided to end her life. She circumambulated the stepwell with prayers and jumped into the well, ending the saga of building the well in tragedy.

One version, which is narrated in the 200 years old scriptures of the Swaminarayan sect, suggests that before she died, Rani Roopba requested religious saints to take a bath in this stepwell so that the water in the stepwell gets purified by these saints, thereby delivering her from her sins.

Another is linked to the tombs found near the well. The graves of six masons who built the well are seen near the Vav. Begda asked the Masons if they could make another similar well, and when they agreed, Begda sentenced them to death instead. Begda was so impressed by the architectural excellence of the stepwell that he did not want a replica to be built.

Structure

Built-in sandstone in the Solanki architectural style, the Adalaj stepwell is five stories deep. It is octagonal in a plan at the top, built on an intricately carved large number of pillars. Each floor is spacious enough to provide for people to congregate. It was dug deep to access groundwater at that level, accounting for seasonal fluctuations in water level due to rainfall over the years. The air and light vents in the roofs at various floors and the landing level are in the form of large openings. From the first story level, three staircases lead to the bottom water level of the well, which is considered a unique feature. Built along a north-south axis, the entrance is from the south, and the three staircases are from the south, west, and east directions leading to the landing, which is on the northern side of the well. Four small rooms with oriel windows decorated with minutely carved brackets are provided at the landing level, at the four corners. The structural system is typically Indian with traditional trabeate with horizontal beams and lintels. At the bottom of the well is a square stepped floor in the shape of a funnel extending to the lowest plane. This is chiseled into a circular well. Above the square floor, columns, beams, walls, and arched openings spiral around, a feature that continues to the top. However, the top part of the well is a vertical space open to the sky. The four corners of the square are strengthened with stone beams, set at 45 degrees angle.

The motifs of flowers and graphics of architecture blend very well with the symbols of Hindu and Jain gods carved at various levels of the well. The dominant carvings on the upper floors are of elephants ( in size, each of a different design). The Islamic architectural style could be attributed to the Muslim king Begda who built it. The walls are carved with women performing daily chores such as churning of buttermilk, adorning themselves, scenes of the performance of dancers and musicians, and the King overlooking all these activities.

An interesting depiction carved from a single block of stone is of the Ami Khumbor (symbolic pot of the water of life) and the Kalp Vriksha (a tree of life). Also seen is a fresco of navagraha or nine planets. These depictions are said to attract villagers for worship during marriage and other ritualistic ceremonies.

The temperature inside the well is about five degrees lower than the outside hot summer temperatures. This encouraged the women who came to fetch water to spend more time in the cool climes here. They stayed to worship the gods and goddesses and gossip.

A tribute paid to the rich underground structures, which are intricately decorated with sculptures, is that they are said to resemble palaces.

Tourist information

Ahmedabad is well connected by road, rail, and air links with the rest of the country. The international airport at Ahmedabad, the Sardar Vallabhbhai Patel Airport, has flights operating to several countries. Gandhinagar is the railway station closest to the stepwell.

See also
 Dada Harir Stepwell
 Mata Bhavani's Stepwell
 Amritavarshini Vav
 Jethabhai's Stepwell
 Ahmedabad

References

Bibliography
 Livingston, Morna (2002). Steps to water: the ancient stepwells of India, p211, Princeton Architecture Press, .

External links

Adalaj Vav – A beautiful stepwell with a tragic tale
Photo gallery
A Pictorial narration
 Adalaj Stepwell and around
 

Stepwells in Gujarat
Buildings and structures completed in 1499
Buildings and structures in Gujarat
Tourist attractions in Ahmedabad
Monuments of National Importance in Gujarat